Lynn Garden is a community and neighborhood in Kingsport, Tennessee.

Lynn Garden's boundaries are that of Kingsport's zip code 37665.

Postal service
Lynn Garden does not currently have a post office, but once did. The community has its own zip code (37665).

References

Neighborhoods in Tennessee
Kingsport, Tennessee
Unincorporated communities in Tennessee
Unincorporated communities in Sullivan County, Tennessee